Protocaiman is a caimanine genus of crocodylian first described in 2018. The type species Protocaiman peligrensis was discovered in Argentina's Salamanca Formation, and lived in Patagonia during the Paleocene epoch.

References

Alligatoridae
Crocodilians of South America
Paleocene genera
Prehistoric pseudosuchian genera
Fossil taxa described in 2018
Golfo San Jorge Basin
Salamanca Formation
Paleogene Argentina